Carex montis-everesti is a tussock-forming perennial in the family Cyperaceae. It is native to parts of the Himalaya.

See also
 List of Carex species

References

montis-everesti
Plants described in 1934
Taxa named by Georg Kükenthal
Flora of Nepal
Flora of Tibet